Otitoma neocaledonica is a species of sea snail, a marine gastropod mollusk in the family Pseudomelatomidae, the turrids and allies.

Description
The length of the shell varies between 5.5 mm and 8.2 mm.

Distribution
This marine species occurs in the Pacific Ocean off the New Caledonia.

References

 Morassi M., Nappo A. & Bonfitto A. (2017). New species of the genus Otitoma Jousseaume, 1898 (Pseudomelatomidae, Conoidea) from the Western Pacific Ocean. European Journal of Taxonomy. 304: 1-30

External links
 Gastropods.com: Otitoma neocaledonica

neocaledonica
Gastropods described in 2017